Orlando Martínez Oliva (August 23, 1941 – March 8, 2007) was a utility player, manager, coach and scout in Major League Baseball. Listed at 6' 0" , 170 lb. , Martínez was a switch-hitter and threw right-handed.

Born in Havana, Cuba, Martínez was nicknamed Marty by fans and teammates. He never hit a home run in 945 major-league career at-bats, but did everything a player was asked to do. Martínez appeared at shortstop in 157 games, and also played at first (5), second (59), and third bases (74); caught (30), and made a relief appearance. Nevertheless, he is best remembered as the man who scouted and signed Edgar Martínez and Omar Vizquel, among other distinguished players.

Signed by the Washington Senators as an amateur free agent in 1960, Martínez reached the majors in 1962 with the Minnesota Twins, spending one year with them before moving to the Atlanta Braves (1967–1968), Houston Astros (1969–1971), St. Louis Cardinals (1972), Oakland Athletics (1972) and Texas Rangers  (1972). In 1968 with Atlanta, he appeared in a career-high 113 games. In 1969, he hit a career-high .308 in 78 games for Houston as a backup catcher for Johnny Edwards and also played six different positions. 

In all or part of seven seasons, Martínez was a .243 hitter with 57 RBI and 97 runs in 436 games, including 230 hits, 19 doubles, 11 triples and seven stolen bases.

Following his major league career, Martínez played and managed for the Tulsa Drillers, Texas Rangers Double-A affiliate. He managed the Drillers in 1977 and 1978 and led the team to a Texas League first-half title in 1977. After that, he spent more than a decade in the Seattle Mariners organization as a coach on the staffs of Del Crandall, Chuck Cottier and Bill Plummer (1983–86; 1992), serving as the Mariners interim manager in the 1986 season. As a Mariners instructor, he nurtured and molded a whole generations of Seattle infielders, including the aforementioned Vizquel and Martínez, as well as Harold Reynolds and Spike Owen.

He died of a heart attack  at the age of 65.

External links

Marty Martínez at SABR BioProject
Marty Martínez at Baseball Almanac
Marty Martínez at Pura Pelota (Venezuelan Professional Baseball League)
"Baseball Marty" left big impression on Mariners The Seattle Times (Obituary)

1941 births
2007 deaths
Águilas del Zulia players
Atlanta Braves players
Atlanta Crackers players
Cardenales de Lara players
Cuban expatriate baseball players in Venezuela
Charlotte Hornets (baseball) players
Denver Bears players
Erie Sailors players
Florida Instructional League Twins players
Houston Astros players
Major League Baseball catchers
Major League Baseball infielders
Major League Baseball outfielders
Major League Baseball players from Cuba
Cuban expatriate baseball players in the United States
Minnesota Twins players
Minor league baseball managers
Oakland Athletics players
Pittsfield Rangers players
San Antonio Brewers players
Seattle Mariners coaches
Seattle Mariners managers
Seattle Mariners scouts
Spokane Indians players
Baseball players from Havana
Sportspeople from Santo Domingo
St. Louis Cardinals players
Texas Rangers players
Tulsa Drillers players
Wausau Timbers players
Wilson Tobs players